Saravanan Irukka Bayamaen is a 2017 Indian Tamil-language supernatural comedy film written and directed by Ezhil, starring Udhayanidhi Stalin, Regina Cassandra and Srushti Dange. The film began production in July 2016 and was released on 12 May 2017.

Plot
Saravanan is a jobless youth who roams around in a two-wheeler with his friends. Kalyanam decides to be the head of a famous political party called Dho Jindhagi. However, when a drunk photographer incorrectly takes some photos, Kalyanam is targeted by the police. With the help of Saravanan, he goes to Dubai, and it is eventually revealed that Kalyanam had to take care of camels in Dubai. After Kalyanam leaves for Dubai, Saravanan's friends overexaggerate about Saravanan to the head of Dho Jindhagi, who appoints Saravanan as head. Two years later, Saravanan's other uncle and their family come to visit. Saravanan's cousin Thenmozhi also comes and demands his house (which is now a party office) to be cleaned before she comes. It is revealed that Saravanan and Thenmozhi were schoolmates and were always fighting, until Thenmozhi left town. Saravanan does not have any other place to start the party office as he had earlier used Thenmozhi's house for that purpose and Kalyanam's wife gives their new house to him without Kalyanam's knowledge, and when he arrives, he is shocked. He takes Saravanan to be his enemy, and along with Thenmozhi, plans to take revenge. Various hilarious situations are witnessed, and meanwhile, Thenmozhi gets engaged to Veerasingam's son Rajadurai, (Chaams) who is somewhat immature. This hurts Saravanan, who had fallen in love with Thenmozhi. In many incidents, Thenmozhi is seen to act supportive to Saravanan though she hates him, shocking others. It is later revealed that she is possessed by the ghost of Fathima, a Muslim girl who was in love with Saravanan but had died due to an accident. Saravanan enjoys life with Thenmozhi as Fathima. But when the family learns about this, they get angry on Saravanan for cheating them. What Saravanan does to reunite with Thenmozhi by convincing his family and breaking her marriage with Rajadurai, forms the crux of the story.

Cast

Udhayanidhi Stalin as Saravanan
Regina Cassandra as Thenmozhi
Srushti Dange as Fathima
Soori as Kalyanam
Jangiri Madhumitha as Saraswathy; Kalyanam's wife
Rajasekar as Saravanan's father
Anjali Varadharajan as Saravanan's mother
Mansoor Ali Khan as Veerasingam
Livingston as Selvam, Thenmozhi's father
Nithya Ravindran as Thenmozhi's mother
Chaams as Rajadurai, Veerasingam's son
Yogi Babu as Babu, Saravanan's friend
Ashvin Raja as Saravanan's friend
Joe Malloori as Fathima's father
Rethika Srinivas as Fathima's mother
Manobala as Swamy
Madhan Bob as Curtain Sharma
 Thadi Balaji as Moorthy
G. M. Kumar as Veerasingam's father-in-law
Saravana Subbiah as Police Officer
George Maryan as Police Officer
 Madhan Pandian as Kalyanam's cousin
Mahanadi Shankar
K. S. Jayalakshmi as Nagalakshmi
Kothandam as Photographer
Mohamed Kuraishi as Saravanan's friend
Bava Lakshmanan as Veerasingam's henchman
Risha Jacobs as Jignashree
Lollu Uthayakumar
Sakthi
Anusree  (cameo appearance)
Robo Shankar as Saudaswaran (guest appearance)
Ravi Mariya as Maudeswaran (guest appearance)

Production
In July 2016, Udhayanidhi Stalin revealed that he would produce and act in a new comedy film to be directed by Ezhil whose previous was Velainu Vandhutta Vellaikaaran. Regina Cassandra and Srushti Dange joined the film as lead actresses in late July 2016 and the film began production thereafter. Actor Soori has been roped in this project to take care of comedy. The film was officially titled as Saravanan Irukka Bayamaen in September 2016, with a first look poster of the film released.

Release
This film was released on 12 May 2017.

Soundtrack

After Manam Kothi Paravai, Desingu Raja, and Vellaikaara Durai, D. Imman collaborates with director Ezhil for the fourth time and his first collaboration with actor Udhayanidhi Stalin. The soundtrack contains five songs which were written by Yugabharathi. Imman has composed tunes for some peppy numbers. K. G. Venkatesh has handled the camera.

Track list

The song "Marhaba Aavona" rendered by Shreya Ghoshal was not a part of the film although the song was a hit. Shreya Ghoshal got both critical and commercial acclaim for the soulful rendition. The song was used by various television serials as a background song. One it was played in the popular soap opera Iniya Iru Malargal(Kumkum Bhagya-Dubbed Version)

References

External links
 

2017 films
2010s Tamil-language films
Indian comedy films
Films scored by D. Imman
Films directed by Ezhil
2017 comedy films